Steffen Lauser (born 4 March 1984) is a German former professional footballer who played as a midfielder.

Career 
On 5 May 2008, Lauser made his debut for AC Horsens, scoring the deciding goal in a 3–2 win over champions F.C. Copenhagen. In summer 2009, he signed for FSV Hollenbach on a two-year contract.

References

External links
 Career statistics at danskfodbold.com 
 

1984 births
Living people
German footballers
Association football midfielders
Hamburger SV II players
SV Babelsberg 03 players
AC Horsens players
Danish Superliga players
German expatriate footballers
German expatriate sportspeople in Denmark
Expatriate men's footballers in Denmark